The Pic de Rochebrune (or Grand Rochebrune or, simply, Rochebrune) is a mountain in the Cottian Alps belonging to the French department of Hautes-Alpes.

Etymology 
The literal English translation of Pic de Rochebrune can be dark rock peak or brown rock peak.

Geography 
The mountain is the highest summit of the Central Cottian Alps.

Nature conservation 
The Pic de Rochebrune is located on the northern border of the regional nature park of Queyras (Parc naturel régional du Queyras ), established in 1977.

Access to the summit 
The easiest route to reach the summit starts from the Izoard pass. It requires some climbing skills.

References

Maps
 French  official cartography (Institut géographique national - IGN); on-line version:  www.geoportail.fr

See also
 Pic de Petit Rochebrune

External links 
 Pic de Rochebrune: 360° panoramic image from the summit on pano.ica-net.it

Alpine three-thousanders
Mountains of the Alps
Mountains of Hautes-Alpes